Nancy Youdelman (born 1948, New York City) is a mixed media sculptor who lives and works in Clovis, California. She also taught art at California State University, Fresno from 1999 until her retirement in 2013. "Since the early 1970s Youdelman has been transforming clothing into sculpture, combining women's and girl's dresses, hats, gloves, shoes, and undergarments with a variety of organic materials (flowers, roots, leaves, and vines) and common household objects (buttons, pins, photographs, and letters).

Marina La Palma writes in The magazine, "Youdelman studied costume design at Fresno State University and was drawn into the Feminist Art program founded by Judy Chicago in 1970. She went on to the Cal Arts program that followed a short time after this. Youdelman participated in the 1972 Womanhouse, in which artists created elaborate installations in the various rooms of an old Hollywood mansion. Womanhouse evolved to become "the influential and long-lived Los Angeles Woman's Building project, and inspired similar undertakings in other cities."

Education

M. F. A., University of California, Los Angeles, 1976
B. F. A., California Institute of the Arts, 1973
California State University, Fresno, major study: English Literature, Costume and Make-up for the Theater and Art, 1966-1971

Selected solo exhibitions

Nancy Youdelman: Fashioning a Feminist Vision 1972-2017, Fresno Art Museum, catalogue, California, 2017
Nancy Youdelman: Embellished, Tai Modern, Santa Fe, New Mexico, 2014-2015
From There to Here: Nancy Youdelman, Four Decades as a Feminist Artist, Palmer Museum of Art, Penn State School of Visual Arts, 2014
Dogs are Forever, Eight Modern, Santa Fe, New Mexico, 2013
The Dearest Allen Series, Letters to Allen and Who Was Betty Potter?, Gallery 25, Fresno California, 2012
Outside the Realm, Eight Modern, Santa Fe, New Mexico, 2011
Threads of Memory, Eight Modern, Santa Fe, New Mexico, 2008
Recent Work, Gallery 25, Fresno, California, 2006
Clothing, Metaphor & Memory, Mohr Art Gallery, Community School of Music & Art, Mountain View, California, 2006
Leaves 2003, installation, Conley Art Gallery, CSU Fresno, California, 2003
Disembodied Garments, curated by Jaquelin Pilar, Fresno Art Museum, California, 2000
Clothing Transformations, Fresno Pacific University, California, 1998
Nancy Youdelman, Assemblage, Fresno Air Terminal, California, 1995
Nancy Youdelman, Ovsey Gallery, Los Angeles, 1990
Nancy Youdelman, Molly Barnes Gallery, Los Angeles, 1983
Tableaux-Remnants, Grandview Gallery, Los Angeles, California, 1974

Selected group exhibitions

A Show of Hands: Imprints of Humanity, ACA Galleries, New York, New York, 2018
The Art of the Cooks of Peace Press, Arena 1 Gallery, Santa Monica, California, 2017
F*ck U in the Most Loving Way, Northern California Women's Caucus for Art,  Arc Gallery, San Francisco, California, 2016-2017
Why Not Judy Chicago?, curated by Xabier Arakistain, CAPC Musée d'Art Contemporain, Bordeaux, France, 2016
Why Not Judy Chicago?, curated by Xabier Arakistain, Bilbao, Spain, 2015
XX Redux, Guggenheim Gallery, Chapman University, Orange, California, March, 2015
A 'Womanhouse' or a Roaming House? 'A Room of One's Own' Today, A.I.R. Gallery, curated by Mira Schor, Brooklyn, New York, 2014
Bound, Phoenix Gallery, Women's Caucas for Art National Exhibition (catalogue), New York, New York, 2013
Nancy Youdelman, Mark Paron, Walter Robinson and Cara Alhadeff, Chanel Boutique, Maiden Lane, San Francisco, Sponsored by SFMOMA, Chanel and Vanity Fair, 2005
Four Generations of Armenian Artists, Fresno Art Museum, Fresno, California, 2002
Nancy Youdelman/Nancie Holliday, Fig Tree Gallery, Fresno, California, 1999
Feminist Directions 1970/1996, curated by Amelia Jones and Laura Meyer, Sweeney Art Gallery, University of California, Riverside, 1996
USA Within Limits, Oficina Das Artes Do Livro, São Paulo, Brazil, 1994
40 Years of California Assemblage, Traveling exhibition, Wight Art Gallery, University of California, Los Angeles,1989
At Home, Long Beach Museum of Art, California, 1983
Robert Goulart, Janice Lester and Nancy Youdelman, Cerritos College Art Gallery, Norwalk, California, 1975
Womanhouse, Los Angeles, project of the Feminist Art Program at California Institute of the Arts, Valencia, 1972
First Exhibition, Feminist Art Studio, Rap Weekend, Fresno, California, 1971

Grants

Adolph and Esther Gottlieb Foundation, Visual Arts Grant Recipient, 2007
Pollock/Krasner Foundation Grant Recipient, 2005
C.E.T.A. Artist Grant, member of L.A.C.E., Los Angeles CA, 1978

Feminist Art Program
Nancy Youdelman was one of the first students to participate in the Feminist Art Program, which Judy Chicago started in 1970 at Fresno State College.  She participated in the Feminist Art Program from 1971—1973, including during the 1972 Womanhouse exhibit. Nancy recalls why she signed up for Chicago's class advertised as a sculpture class for women only: 
"There was a place to sign your name; I was intrigued and signed up right away. As an art major I had taken drawing, painting, and photography classes but had avoided sculpture ...Students were required to create a series of three-dimensional cubes, one of plaster, one of wood, then one of metal...I was not interested in making cubes; I did not see the point. Instead I had taken theater classes, mostly costume and makeup, which ended up preparing me for my early artwork--the costume and makeup pieces that I did in that first feminist art class in Fresno".
She also was the artist facilitator for Wo/Manhouse 2022, a reimagining of the original Womanhouse.

References

1948 births
Living people
20th-century American sculptors
California State University, Fresno faculty
California State University, Fresno alumni
California Institute of the Arts alumni
UCLA School of the Arts and Architecture alumni
Artists from New York City
Sculptors from New York (state)
21st-century American sculptors